Kom or KOM may refer to:

Ethnic groups 
 Kom people (Afghanistan), a Nuristani tribe in Afghanistan and Pakistan
 Kom people (Cameroon), an ethnic group of northwest Cameroon
 Kom people (India) a subgroup of the Kuki in north-eastern India
 Kom people (South America), an ethnic group in northeastern Argentina, Bolivia and Paraguay

Languages 
 Kom language (Cameroon), a Bantoid language
 Kom language (India), a Sino-Tibetan language
 Kom language (South America), a Guaicuruan language
 Komi language (ISO 639-3 code: kom)

Music 
Kom (album), by Swedish singer Lars Winnerbäck
"Kom" (Jessica Andersson song), by the Swedish singer Jessica Andersson
"Kom" (Timoteij song), by the Swedish europop group Timoteij
Mathias Kom, Canadian singer-songwriter

Places 
Kom, also župa Komska, a župa of the medieval Bosnian state centered in the village of Glavatičevo
Kom, Croatia, a village
Kom Peak, a mountain peak in Bulgaria
Kom Monastery, a monastery in Montenegro
Knowledge Oasis Muscat, a technology park near Muscat, Oman
Kom, a village part of Kom-Kanas Mongolian Ethnic Township in Xinjiang, China

Sports
FK Kom, a Montenegrin football club
King of the Mountains, award in cycling stage races but also the user with the highest score in the rankings in certain activities monitored by applications such as Strava.
Mary Kom, an Indian boxer

Other uses 
Kickoff meeting,  the first meeting with the project team and the client of the project
KOM (BBS), a type of bulletin board system
KoM, Knight of Malta, in the Sovereign Military Order of Malta

See also 
 Qom (disambiguation)
 Com (disambiguation)
 Nkom (disambiguation)

Language and nationality disambiguation pages